The Somers Point Public Schools are a community public school district that serves students in pre-kindergarten through eighth grade from Somers Point, in Atlantic County, New Jersey, United States.

As of the 2018–19 school year, the district, comprising three schools, had an enrollment of 894 students and 95.5 classroom teachers (on an FTE basis), for a student–teacher ratio of 9.4:1.

The district is classified by the New Jersey Department of Education as being in District Factor Group "CD", the sixth-highest of eight groupings. District Factor Groups organize districts statewide to allow comparison by common socioeconomic characteristics of the local districts. From lowest socioeconomic status to highest, the categories are A, B, CD, DE, FG, GH, I and J.

Students in public school for ninth through twelfth grades attend Mainland Regional High School, which also serves students from Linwood and Northfield. The high school is located in Linwood. For the 1997-98 school year, Mainland Regional High School was recognized by the United States Department of Education as a National Blue Ribbon School. As of the 2018–19 school year, the high school had an enrollment of 1,226 students and 112.0 classroom teachers (on an FTE basis), for a student–teacher ratio of 10.9:1.

The district's Education Foundation has funded technology programs, mini-grants and the annual Stokes Trip, investing approximately $250,000 to schools since it was established in 1995.

Schools
The Somers Point School District consists of three school facilities: Jordan Road School, constructed in 1966 with an addition in 1991; Dawes Avenue School, constructed in 1998; and New York Avenue School, constructed in 1914 with an addition in 1922 and a refurbishing project in 2005, which houses the district's central offices. Beginning with the 2018-19 school year, after considering several alternative options, the district was reconfigured so that Jordan Road School will house grades forth to eighth grade and Dawes Avenue School will house kindergarten to third grade, while New York Avenue School will remain the same consisting of Pre-K and the administration offices.

Schools in the district (with 2018–19 enrollment data from the National Center for Education Statistics) are:
Preschool
New York Avenue School with 70 students in pre-kindergarten
Kim Tucker, Principal
Elementary schools
Dawes Avenue School with 387 students in grades Kindergarten through 3rd grade
Doreen A. Lee, Principal
Jordan Road Middle School with 425 students in 4th through 8th grade
Carleena Supp, Principal
Eileen Ward, Assistant Principal

Administration
Core members of the district's administration are:
Dr. Michelle CarneyRay-Yoder, Superintendent of Schools
Dr. Michele Roemer, Business Administrator / Board Secretary

Board of education
The district's board of education, with nine members, sets policy and oversees the fiscal and educational operation of the district through its administration. As a Type II school district, the board's trustees are elected directly by voters to serve three-year terms of office on a staggered basis, with three seats up for election each year held (since 2012) as part of the November general election. The board appoints a superintendent to oversee the day-to-day operation of the district.

2012 mold problem
On September 4, 2012, parents were notified about mold at Jordan Road School. After other district schools were examined, the district decided that school opening would be delayed by a week at all schools.

References

External links
Somers Point Public Schools

School Data for the Somers Point Public Schools, National Center for Education Statistics

Somers Point, New Jersey
New Jersey District Factor Group CD
School districts in Atlantic County, New Jersey